Rahel Varnhagen: The Life of a Jewess is a book-length biography of Rahel Varnhagen written by political philosopher Hannah Arendt. Originally her Habilitationsschrift she completed it in exile as a refugee, but was not published till 1957, in English, in the UK (London) by East and West Library.

History 

Rahel Varnhagen was Arendt's Habilitationsschrift, largely written in the 1930s, but which she was unable to complete, having to flee Nazi Germany. She took the manuscript with her into exile in Paris, where she was able to complete it in 1938. Forced to flee once again, this time without her manuscript, she arrived in America in 1941. However, she had given a copy to Gershom Scholem, and it was finally published in 1957 having been translated from German.  The book was later translated into French in 1986, and Spanish in 2000. A revised edition in 1974 used the subtitle The Life of a Jewish Woman. A later biography of the subject by Heidi Thomann Tewarson (2001) distanced itself from Arendt's work, which its author considered too critical of Varnhagen. Arendt dedicated the book to her life-long friend Anne Mendelssohn, who had first drawn her attention to Varnhagen's writing.

Content 

Rahel Varnhagen is ostensibly a biography of this nineteenth century Jewish socialite, and formed an important step in Arendt's analysis of Jewish history and the subjects of assimilation and emancipation, and introduced her treatment of the Jewish diaspora as either pariah or parvenu. In addition it represents an early version of her concept of history. Arendt's relation to Varnhagen permeates her subsequent work. Her examination of Varnhagen's life is set against the background of the catastrophic destruction of German-Jewish culture and its demonstrations of the illusion of any true German-Jewish "symbiosis" and the threatened existence of her subject. In this sense the book partially reflects Arendt's own view of herself as a German Jewish woman driven out of her own culture into a stateless existence. In this sense the work has been referred to as "biography as autobiography".

References

Bibliography 

 
 * 
 
 
 
 
 
 
 
 
 
 
 
 
  (updated by way of a second preface, pagination unchanged)

Bibliographic notes 

1959 non-fiction books
Books by Hannah Arendt
Biographies about writers
German books